Senator Sykes may refer to:

Anthony Sykes (born 1972), Oklahoma State Senate
Dinah Sykes (born 1977), Kansas State Senate
James Sykes (Continental Congress) (1725–1792), Delaware State Senate
James Sykes (governor) (1761–1822), Delaware State Senate
Vernon Sykes (born 1951), Ohio State Senate

See also
E. Walter Sikes (1868–1941), North Carolina State Senate